Pasiphila vieta is a moth in the family Geometridae.  This species was discovered by Amy Castle. It was described by George Hudson in 1950 using specimens collected by Castle. It is endemic to New Zealand.

References

Moths described in 1950
vieta
Moths of New Zealand
Taxa named by George Hudson